Suratgarh tehsil (in Hindi and Rajasthani सूरतगढ़ तहसील ) is the largest administrative region (tehsil) in the Ganganagar district. It is bordered on the north by Padampur tehsil, on the west by Vijaynagar tehsil and Raisinghnagar tehsil, on the south by Bikaner district, and on the east by Hanumangarh district.
Suratgarh is a Brand .

Geography

Suratgarh tehsil is located in the Thar desert. The seasonal Ghaggar-Hakra River runs in the northern area of the tehsil and the south region is called Uncha Tibba. The Indira Gandhi Canal crosses the tehsil.
Some Remarkable area in Suratgarh are Super Critical Thermal Power Plant, Shree Cement Plant Udaipur Village, All Indio Radio Station Aakashwani, Airforce Station, Military Area.
 PIN code of Suratgarh Tehsil's Villages Are -- 
335804 (Suratgarh S.O.) - Suratgarh, Ghamandia, Sardarpura Bika, Rampura Neola, Ramsara Jakhran, Nirwana, Manaksar, Bhagwansar, Birdhwal Head, Deidaspura, Rajiasar, Farm Colony, Mokalsar, Maler, Hindor, Govindsar, Rajpura Piperan,.
335805 (STPS Suratgarh S.O.) - STPS, Somasar, Thukrana, Rayanwali, Thethar, Birdhwal RS..
335803 (Pilibanga S.O.) - Dhaban, Sanghar. 
335802 (Goluwala S.O.) - Gurusar Modia. 
335705 (Sardargarh S.O.) - Sardargarh, 3 Fdm, 8 Shpd. 
335704 (SriBijaynagar S.O.) - Birmana, Raghunathpura, Gudli, Bhopalpura..

Major villages 
Major villages in Suratgarh Above 3000 Population are 8 like 15 LKS(Dhaban), 2 SGM, 11 SGM(Sardargarh), 3 BMM(Birmana), Peepasar, 2 MNWM( Manewala), Raghunathpura, Prabhatnagar.

In Suratgarh Tehsil 49 Gram Panchayats and more Other Villages and Chaks are like - Sri Gurusar Modia(26Mod), Birmana(3Bmm), Amarpura Jaatan, Ramsara Jakharan(20 Stb), Faridsar, Thukrana, Bhagwansar (1Sgm), Singarasar, Deidaspura, Sardarpura Khartha, Udaipur Godaran (6MC), Bhairoonpura(Silwani), Padampura(4Ppm), RajpuraPiperan, Somasar, 10Sgr(Sanghar), Rajiyasar, Birdhwal, Bhopalpura(1LM), Raghunathpura, Rangmahal, Jankidaswala, Sardargarh(11Sgm), Ghamandia(6Gmd), Rampura Nyola(1Rm), Dhaban(15LKS), Manaksar, Shyopura(4Ksr),1F.D.M., 3F.D.M., 3S.H.P.D., 8S.H.P.D, Sangita(2Sd), Lalgadiya (4LGM), Bhagwangarh (5Dbn), Sardarpura Bika(25Lgw), Nirbana (3Nrd), Paliwala(17Stb), Faridasar(9Fdm), Gudli, Sadakwala(5FDM), Maler, Kardoo, Shyonathpura, Harisinghpura, Aeta, Thethar,  etc.

Agriculture

Crops include rice, wheat, mustard, guar, and pearl millet.

People
The Bagri dialect of the Rajasthani language is widely spoken, along with Punjabi in the northern and western parts of the tehsil. Major towns and villages are Suratgarh, Dhaban Jhallar(15Lks), Sardargarh, Birmana, Manewala , Raghunathpura. Rajiyasar is a Sub Tehsil in Suratgarh

Transportation
Road is the main medium of transport. NH 62 (Old 15) crosses into the tehsil from north to south. The region is also serviced by rail to approx. all over India but still lack of superfast trains like rajdhani and duronto express trains.
Suratgarh's Vehicle Registration Number under RJ 13

Sri Ganganagar district
Tehsils of Rajasthan

Health Services
There are 3 Govt. CHCs in Suratgarh tehsil are at Suratgarh, Nirbana, Rajiyasar and 8 PHCs are at Sardargarh, Dhaban aka Dhaban Jhallar, Deidaspura, Thukrana, Somasar, Birmana, Bakhtawarpura, UPHC Suratgarh,